Devika Devadoss (born Prameela Devi) (25 April 1943 – 2 May 2002) was an Indian actress who worked in Tamil, Telugu with few Malayalam, Kannada, Hindi film industry. She was a popular lead actress in the 1960s.

Devika is the daughter of Gajapati Naidu and the grand daughter of Telugu cinema doyen and pioneer Raghupathi Venkaiah Naidu. One of her uncles, C. Basudev, was a Mayor of Chennai. Actress Kanaka is her daughter.

Film career 
In Tamil, she has acted with all major heroes of the day.
In Mudhalali, an AVM film, in which she made her debut, she paired with S. S. Rajendran. The film received a certificate as the (Best regional language film) for the year from the National Film Award for Best Feature Film in Tamil.

She paired with M. G. Ramachandran in Anandha Jodhi. She won accolades from viewers for the role she played in this film.

With Sivaji Ganesan she has acted in films like Karnan, Kulamagal Radhai, Andavan Kattalai, Anbu Karangal, Annai Illam, Paava Mannippu, Muradan Muthu, Neela Vaanam and Bale Pandiya.

Her role in Sumaithaangi was very moving. Though she is paired with Gemini Ganesan in this film, the relationship did not culminate in marriage and the end was a tragedy. This was a film by Sridhar.

She acted in some other Sridhar films like Nenjam Marappathillai and Nenjil Or Aalayam. The song Sonnadhu Nee thaanaa in Nenjil or Aalayam became a hit because of her acting, apart from the lyrics and music.

Devika was admitted to Madras Hospital when she complained of chest pain and after a few days she died following a heart attack.

Filmography

Tamil 

Naanum Oru Thozhilali (1986)
Sathyam (1976)
Ippadiyum Oru Penn (1975)
Pillai Selvam (1974)
 Paruva Kaalam (1974)
Bharatha Vilas (1973)
Anbu Sagodharargal (1973)
Veguli Penn (1971)
Annai Velankanni (1971)
Engirundho Vandhaal (1970)
Devi (1968)
Deiveega Uravu (1968)
Thaaye Unakkaga (1966)
Saraswathi Sabatham (1966)
Marakka Mudiyuma? (1966)
Thiruvilaiyadal (1965)
Anbu Karangal (1965)
Shanthi (1965)
Neela Vaanam (1965)
Pazhani (1965)
Vaazhkai Padagu (1965)
Muradan Muthu (1964)
Karnan (1964)
Aandavan Kattalai (1964)
Nenjam Marappathillai (1963)
Idhayathil Nee (1963)
Anandha Jodhi (1963)
Kulamagal Radhai (1963)
Vanambadi (1963)
Kubera Theevu (1963)
Yarukku Sontham (1963)
Kadavulai Kanden (1963)
Pannaiyar Magan (1963)
Annai Illam (1963)
Nenjil Or Aalayam (1962)
Pirandha Naal (1962)
Neeya Naana? (1962)
Bandha Pasam (1962)
Sumaithaangi (1962)
Dakshayagnam (1962) as Sathi Devi
Bale Pandiya (1962)
Aadi Perukku (1962)
Pangaaligal (1961)
Mamiyarum Oru Veetu Marumagale (1961)
Malliyam Mangalam (1961)
Kaanal Neer (1961)
Paava Mannippu (1961)
Naaga Nandhini (1961)
Kalathur Kannamma (1960)
Ivan Avanethan (1960)
Panchaali (1959)
Sahodhari (1959)
Naalu Veli Nilam (1959)
Anbu Engey (1958)
Manamagan Thevai (1957)
Mudhalali (1957)

Telugu filmography

A
Adavalle Aligithe (1983)
Aada Brathuku (1965)
Anna Chellalu (1960)
Atta okinti kodale (1958)

B
Bhama Vijayam (1967)
Batasari (1961)

C
Chinnanati Snehitulu (1971)
Chitti Tammudu (1962)

D
Dharma Pathini (1969)
Desa Drohulu (1964)
Dakshayagnam (1962) as Sathi Devi

G
Gandikota Rahasyam (1969) as Lalitha
Gaali Medalu (1962)

K
Kanchu Kota (1967)
Karnan (1963)
Kanna Koduku (1961)

M
Mangalasutram (1966)
Mahamantri Timmarusu (1962)
Mangalyam (1960)

N
Nindu Manasulu (1967)
Nippulanti Manishi (1974)
Niluvu Dopidi (1968)
Nuvva? Nena? (1962)

P
Palleturi Chinnodu (1974)...Janakamma
Papam Pasivadu (1972) as Janaki
Papa Kosam (1968)
Pinni (1967)
Pempudu Koothuru (1963)
Pendli Pilupu (1961)
Papa Pariharam (1961)

R
Rajakota Rahasyam (1971) as Kanchana
Rakta Sambandham (1962)
Rechukka (1955) as Lalitha Devi

S
Srimadvirat Veerabrahmendra Swami Charitra (1984)
Sri Krishnanjaneya Yuddham (1972)
 Sri Krishna Satya (1971) as Rukmini
Sugunasundari Katha (1970)
Sri Krishnavataram (1967)
Somavara Vratha Mahathyam (1963)
Sabhash Raja (1961)
Sahasra Siracheda Apoorva Chinthamani (1960)
Santhi Nivasam (1960)
Sabhash Ramudu (1959)

T
Tara Sasankam (1969) as Tara
Taxi Ramudu (1961)

V
Vijayam Manade (1970)
Manamagan Thevai  (1957)

Malayalam 
Pullimaan (1972)
C.I.D. In Jungle (1971)
Nizhalattam (1970)
Karuna (1966)
Kattupookkal (1965) as Annie

Hindi 
Naya Din Nai Raat (1974)
Grahasti (1963)
Man-Mauji (1962)
Gharana (1961)
Ghar Sansar (1958)

Kannada 
Maadi Madidavaru (1974)
Bhale Rani (1972)

References

External links 
 

1943 births
2002 deaths
Actresses from Chennai
Indian film actresses
Actresses in Tamil cinema
Actresses in Kannada cinema
Actresses in Hindi cinema
Actresses in Telugu cinema
Actresses in Malayalam cinema
20th-century Indian actresses
21st-century Indian actresses